The Plebeians Rehearse the Uprising (German: Die Plebejer proben den Aufstand) is a 1966 play by German writer Günter Grass. It was premiered at the Berlin Schillertheater on 15 January 1966. In the play, Grass criticizes Bertolt Brecht and his Berliner Ensemble for inaction in response to the East German uprising of 1953.

A 1970 English language version of the play was performed by the Royal Shakespeare Company at the Aldwych Theatre.

References

1966 plays
Works by Günter Grass
German-language plays
Tragedy plays